USCGC Argus (WMSM-915) is the lead ship of the s of the United States Coast Guard (USCG), and a part of the OPC (Offshore Patrol Cutter) Ship Type. She is the second ship to be named after Argus Panoptes, the first being USRC Argus, a Revenue Cutter Service ship which was decommissioned and sold in 1804.

Development and design 

They are tasked to go against lightly armed hostiles in low-threat environments.

In February 2014, the USCG announced that Bollinger Shipyards, Eastern Shipbuilding, and General Dynamics Bath Iron Works had been awarded design contracts for the OPC. The Government Accountability Office denied contract appeals by VT Halter Marine and Ingalls Shipbuilding.

In September 2016, Eastern Shipbuilding of Panama City, Florida, was awarded a $110.3 million contract to build the first Offshore Patrol Cutter with an option to purchase eight additional cutters. On October 15, 2016 the Coast Guard issued a notice to proceed with the detailed design of the Offshore Patrol Cutter to Eastern Shipbuilding.

Construction and career 
The construction of Argus was planned to begin in the late summer of 2018, with delivery in August 2021. On September 28, 2018, the USCG exercised the contract option to begin construction of the lead Offshore Patrol Cutter, along with long-lead materials for OPC #2. The total value of the options exercised is $317.5 million. Delayed by the impact of Hurricane Michael in October 2018, steel cutting for USCGC Argus began on January 7, 2019. She was laid down on 28 April 2020.

See also
 Integrated Deepwater System Program

References

Heritage-class cutters
Ships of the United States Coast Guard